Louis Fontaine (December 20, 1882 Cato, Michigan – March 2, 1960) was an American racecar driver. Fontaine competed in six early Championship Car races from 1912 to 1921 including the 1912 American Grand Prize and the 1921 Indianapolis 500.

Indy 500 results

References

1882 births
1960 deaths
Indianapolis 500 drivers
People from Montcalm County, Michigan
Racing drivers from Michigan